The  2012 Sekondi Three Nations Cup was an association football exhibition competition scheduled to take place in July 2012 as part of the participating nations' preparation for the 2013 African Youth Championship qualifying stage. The tournament was open to teams under 20 years of age, although some reports say that Namibia sent their B team. The games were originally to be hosted at the Essipong Stadium in Sekondi but the Ghanaian FA relocated the tournament to Accra.

Matches

References 

2012
2012–13 in Ghanaian football
2012–13 in Egyptian football
2012 in Namibian sport